The 1986 Gael Linn Cup, the most important representative competition for elite level participants in the women's team field sport of camogie, was won by Leinster, who defeated Munster in the final, played at Silver Park Kilmacud.

Arrangements
Munster defeated Ulster by 5–10 to 0–1 in the semi-final at Kilmacud Crokes' ground in Glenalbyn. Goals from Angela Downey, Jo Dunne and Carmel O'Byrne gave Leinster a 4–6 to 1–6 victory over Munster in the final.
Leinster defeated Munster by two points in the trophy semi-final and Kildare's Miriam Malone scored the winning goal five minutes from the end of the final to give them a one-point win over Munster.

Final stages

|}

Junior Final

|}

References

External links
 Camogie Association

1986 in camogie
1986